A mat is a piece of fabric or other flat material.

Mat or MAT may also refer to:

Places
 Mat District, a district in Dibër County, Albania
 Mat (municipality), a municipality in Dibër County, Albania
 Mat (river), a river in Albania
 Mat (region)
 Mat River, a tributary of the Kaladan River in Mizoram State, India
 Mat River, a tributary of the Mattaponi River in Virginia, United States

People
 Mat, a masculine given name, see Matt (name)
 Mats (given name)
 Ajen Yohl Mat (died 612), ruler of the Maya city-state of Palenque
 Sak K'uk' or Muwaan Mat (died 640), queen of the Maya city-state of Palenque
 Mat Prakash (died 1704), Raja of the Indian kingdom of Sirmur
 Mat Davidson (1869–1949), Australian politician
 Muhammad Indera or Mat Indera (c. 1920–1953), Malay communist leader
 Mat Mathews (1924–2009), Dutch accordionist
Mat Dickie (born 1980/1981), English indie video game designer and developer
 Mathieu Trésarrieu (born 1986), French motorcycle racer
 Mat Zo (born 1990), stage name of Matan Zohar

MAT
 MAT Macedonian Airlines
 MAT Airways, defunct, Skopje, Republic of Macedonia
 Malta, UNDP country code
 Management Aptitude Test, India
 Manifattura Automobili Torino, Italian cars manufacturer
 Manufacture Nationale d'Armes de Tulle, French manufacturer of MAT-49 machine pistol
 Master of Arts in Teaching, degree
 Medial axis transform
 Micro alloy transistor
 Middletown Area Transit, a transit district serving Middlesex County, Connecticut
 Miller Analogies Test, a graduate school admissions test
 Mobile Anisotropy Telescope
 Moghreb Athletic Tetouan, a Moroccan sports club
 Monades Apokatastasis Taksis, a special police force in Greece
 Monoamine transporter
 Moscow Art Theatre, a theatre company
 Mousterian of Acheulean tradition (fr), a cultural and technological facies of the Mousterian
 Multi-academy trust a UK schools governance model
 Multi Axis Trainer, another name for an aerotrim, a 3-axis gimbal used for training of pilots and astronauts
 Multifocal atrial tachycardia, an irregular heart rhythm
 National Rail station code of Matlock railway station, England
 Maghawir al-Thawra (MaT), the Arabic name of the Revolutionary Commando Army

Other uses
 Mat (1926 film), Soviet Union
 Mat (picture framing)
 Mat (Russian profanity), a category of Russian-language profanities
 A character in the Czech stop-motion series Pat & Mat
 A clump or plait of densely tangled hair or fur; in humans, this may include:
 Dreadlocks
 Polish plait

See also
 
 MATS (disambiguation), acronym
 Lệ Mật, a village in Vietnam
 Maat (disambiguation)
 Mati (disambiguation)
 Matt (disambiguation)
 Matte (disambiguation)
 Matthew (given name)